Sally Reeve is a British actress. She was born in August 1971 in London.

Reeve is the daughter of diplomat Roy Reeve, and spent much of her childhood abroad, in places like Moscow and Johannesburg. She attended Millfield School in Street, Somerset. She trained with the National Youth Theatre and did a degree in Performing Arts at Leicester Polytechnic (now De Montfort University).

She founded GIN Theatre company in 1994 with Jenny Livsey and company members included Georgina Ryan, Simeon Truby, Rob Gardner, Tracy Hitchen and the director in residence was Joyce Branagh.

Reeve's film credits include Maybe Baby (2000), Bright Star (2009), and Jane Eyre (2011). She guest starred on the children's television sitcom The Basil Brush Show in 2002 and 2005. In 2018, she appeared on the Killing Eve episode "Nice Face" as Nurse Watkins and in 2019 in There She Goes as Fiona. She has also worked with Improbable theatre on a production of Così fan tutte. for English National Opera. She appeared in photographer Marco Sanges' series Theatre. which was displayed in London.

She is represented by Royce Management.

Filmography

Personal life
Sally is married with two sons, Oscar and Toby. Toby appeared in Bright Star alongside Reeve. After raising two neurodiverse sons, Sally is an active campaigner for families affected by Autism and is a trustee for SIGNAL charity in Lewisham

References

External links

Sally Reeve's website
Signal Family Support

Living people
1971 births
British actresses
Actresses from London
Alumni of De Montfort University
National Youth Theatre members
People educated at Millfield